Certain former courts of England and Wales have been abolished or merged into or with other courts, and certain other courts of England and Wales have fallen into disuse.

For nearly 300 years, from the time of the Norman Conquest until 1362, French was the language of the courts, rather than English. Until the twentieth century, many legal terms were still expressed in Latin.

Higher civil court system

Middle Ages

Henry VIII
Court of Augmentations
Court of First Fruits and Tenths
Court of General Surveyors
Court of Wards and Liveries

Conciliar courts
Conciliar courts included the Court of Star Chamber and the Court of Requests.

Regional conciliar courts
These included the Council in the North Parts and the Council in the Principality and Marches of Wales.

Eyres

Superior courts at Westminster
Although the words "Superior Courts of Law at Westminster", in the preamble of the Uniformity of Process Act 1832 were, it was conceived by Palmer, sufficient to comprehend the law side of the Court of Chancery or Petty Bag Office, that Court being undoubtedly one of His Majesty's superior Courts at Westminster, yet it was evident, from section 12, as well as other parts of the statute, that the three courts of King's Bench, Common Pleas, and Exchequer, were those which were alone meant by it.

Wharton and Granger refer to "the three superior courts at Westminster".

Section 2 of the Evidence Act 1845 refers to "any of the equity or common law judges of the superior courts at Westminster". The effect of section 151(5) of, and paragraph 1(1) of Schedule 4 to, the Senior Courts Act 1981 and sections 18(2) and 26(2) of the Supreme Court of Judicature (Consolidation) Act 1925, is that the expression "any of the equity or common law judges of the superior courts at Westminster" must be construed and have effect as a reference to judges of the Court of Appeal and High Court.

The superior courts of law at Westminster had a common jurisdiction over certain actions and proceedings.

The Court of King's Bench, Court of Common Pleas, Court of Exchequer and Court of Chancery sat at Westminster Hall.

Supreme Court of Judicature Act 1873

Transfer of jurisdiction to the High Court
The jurisdiction of the following courts was transferred to the High Court of Justice by section 16 of the Supreme Court of Judicature Act 1873:
The High Court of Chancery, as a Common Law Court as well as a Court of Equity, including the jurisdiction of the Master of the Rolls, as a Judge or Master of the Court of Chancery, and any jurisdiction exercised by him in relation to the Court of Chancery as a Common Law Court
The Court of Queen's Bench
The Court of Common Pleas at Westminster
The Court of Exchequer, as a Court of Revenue, as well as a Common Law Court
The High Court of Admiralty
The Court of Probate
The Court for Divorce and Matrimonial Causes
The Court of Common Pleas at Lancaster
The Court of Pleas at Durham
The Courts created by Commissions of Assize, of Oyer and Terminer, and of Gaol Delivery, or any of such Commissions

The jurisdiction of the London Bankruptcy Court was transferred to the High Court by section 93 of the Bankruptcy Act 1883.

The following courts were merged into the High Court by section 41 of the Courts Act 1971:
The Court of Chancery of the County Palatine of Lancaster
The Court of Chancery of the County Palatine of Durham and Sadberge

Appellate courts
The jurisdictions of the following, amongst others, were transferred to the Court of Appeal:
The Court of Exchequer Chamber
The Court of Appeal in Chancery
The Court of Appeal in Chancery of the County Palatine of Lancaster
The Lord Warden of the Stannaries

There was formerly a Court for Crown Cases Reserved. The House of Lords was formerly an appellate court.

Courts of criminal jurisdiction
Courts of criminal jurisdiction included:
Courts of summary jurisdiction
Quarter and General sessions
Special sessions
Courts of Gaol Delivery and Oyer and Terminer
Petty sessions
Assizes

Central Criminal Court

The Central Criminal Court established by the Central Criminal Court Act 1834 was replaced by the Crown Court established by the recommendations  of Dr. Beeching leading to the Courts Act 1971.

Court of Criminal Appeal

Crown courts
The Crown Court of Liverpool and the Crown Court of Manchester established by the Criminal Justice Administration Act 1956 were superseded by the (national) Crown Court established by the Courts Act 1971.

Ecclesiastical courts
These included the Court of High Commission.

Bankruptcy courts
The Court of Bankruptcy was established under the statute 1 & 2 Will 4 c 56. As to bankruptcy courts, see the Bankruptcy Act 1869.

Lower courts

County courts
Some county courts in Wales have closed since 1846.

Local and borough courts of record
These included Courts of Pie Poudre and Courts of the Staple.

Section 42 of the Courts Act 1971 replaced the Mayor's and City of London Court with a county court of the same name.

Section 43 of that Act abolished:
The Tolzey and Pie Poudre Courts of the City and County of Bristol
The Liverpool Court of Passage
The Norwich Guildhall Court
The Court of Record for the Hundred of Salford

Section 221 of the Local Government Act 1972 abolished the borough civil courts listed in Schedule 28 to that Act.

Anomalous local courts
Part II of Schedule 4 to the Administration of Justice Act 1977 curtailed the jurisdiction of certain other anomalous local courts:
 Courts baron
 Courts leet
 Manorial courts customary
 Courts of piepowders
 Courts of the staple
 Courts of the clerk of the market
 Hundred courts
 Law Days
 Views of Frankpledge
 Common law (or sheriffs') county courts as known before the passing of the County Courts Act 1846
 The Basingstoke Court of Ancient Demesne
 The Coventry Court of Orphans
 The Great Grimsby Foreign Court
 The King's Lynn Court of Tolbooth
 The Court of Husting (City of London)
 The Sheriffs' Court for the Poultry Compter (City of London)
 The Sheriffs' Court for the Giltspur Street Compter (City of London)
 The Macclesfield Court of Portmote
 The Maidstone Court of Conservancy
 The Melcombe Regis Court of Husting
 The Newcastle upon Tyne Court of Conscience or Requests
 The Newcastle upon Tyne Court of Conservancy
 The Norwich Court of Mayoralty
 The Peterborough Dean and Chapter's Court of Common Pleas
 The Ramsey (Cambridgeshire) Court of Pleas
 The Ripon Court Military
 The Ripon Dean and Chapter's Canon Fee Court
 The St. Albans Court of Requests
 The Court of the Hundred, Manor and Borough of Tiverton
 The York Court of Husting
 The York Court of Guildhall
 The York Court of Conservancy
 The Ancient Prescriptive Court of Wells
 The Cheyney Court of the Bishop of Winchester.

University courts were limited in jurisdiction to matters relating to the statutes of the university in question:
 Court of the Chancellor or Vice-Chancellor of Oxford University
 The Cambridge University Chancellor's Court

The Court of Minstrels in Tutbury, Staffordshire was ordered to close by the Duke of Devonshire in 1778

Hundred and manorial courts
These included courts leet.

Forest courts

By 1909, the Court of Regard had been obsolete for centuries. Swainmotes were still held, but were mere formalities. No Court of Justice Seat had been held since 1662, and it could be regarded as obsolete.

Courts of the Cinque Ports
The Cinque Ports had a Court of Chancery and a Court of Load Manage for the regulation of pilots until the Cinque Ports Act 1855.

Palatine courts

Durham and Sadberge

The Court of Chancery of the County Palatine of Durham and Sadberge was merged into the High Court by the Courts Act 1971. The Court of Pleas of the County Palatine of Durham and Sadberge was merged into the High Court by the Supreme Court of Judicature Act 1873. The Court of the County of Durham was abolished by section 2 of the Durham (County Palatine) Act 1836.

Lancaster
The Court of Common Pleas of the County Palatine of Lancaster and the 
Court of Chancery of the County Palatine of Lancaster were merged into the High Court. The Court of Appeal in Chancery of the County Palatine of Lancaster was merged into the Court of Appeal.

Chester
Courts of the county palatine of  Chester included the Exchequer of Chester, the County Court of Chester and the Pentice Court of the city of Chester.

The Courts of Session of the County Palatine of Chester and the Principality of Wales were abolished section 14 of by the Law Terms Act 1830.

Stannaries
The Stannaries Court was abolished by the Stannaries Court (Abolition) Act 1896.

Other courts
Lawless Court
Court of Arraye
Board of Green Cloth
Marshalsea Court
Restrictive Practices Court

References
Albert Thomas Carter. A History of English Legal Institutions. 1902. Third Edition. Butterworth. London. 1906. Internet Archive. A History of the English Courts. Fifth Edition. Seventh Edition. Butterworth. 1944. Google Books
Alan Harding. The Law Courts of Medieval England. Allen & Unwin. 1973. Google Books
Christopher Brooks and Michael Lobban (eds). Communities & Courts in Britain, 1150–1900. The Hambledon Press. London and Rio Grande. 1997. . Google Books.
Halsbury's Laws of England. First Edition. 1909. Volume 9. Internet Archive
John Hamilton Baker. An Introduction to English Legal History. Third Edition. Butterworths. 1990. Chapters 2, 3 and 6 to 8.
S E Thorne. "Notes on Courts of Record in England". Essays in English Legal History. The Hambledon Press. London and Ronceverte. 1985. Chapter 6. p 61.
Ralph V Turner. The King and his Courts: The role of John and Henry III in the Administration of Justice, 1199–1240. Cornell University Press. 1968. Google Books:  .

Courts of England and Wales